Rigamonti is an Italian surname. Notable people with the surname include:

Antonio Rigamonti (born 1949), Italian footballer
Ernesto Rigamonti (1864–1942), Italian painter
Flavia Rigamonti (born 1981), Swiss swimmer
Mario Rigamonti (1922–1949), Italian footballer

See also 

 Ripamonti

Italian-language surnames